The 2014–15 NBB season was the 7th season of the Novo Basquete Brasil, the Brazilian basketball league. Once again this tournament was organized entirely by the Liga Nacional de Basquete (LNB). The NBB also qualified teams for international tournaments such as Liga Sudamericana and FIBA Americas League.

This season sixteen teams were played each other in the regular season. At the end of the home and away matches round the top four teams qualified for the quarterfinals of the playoffs automatically, while the teams finishing in the 5th and 12th place participated in the first round of the playoffs to determine the other four teams in the quarterfinals, in a five-match series. This year NBB returned to a series in the Finals, played in a best of three-match.

For this season, only the last regular season placed was relegated to the Liga Ouro, the NBB second division. The Liga Ouro winner receive the right to contest NBB in the next year.

Participating teams 
New teams in the league
Rio Claro Basquete (2014 Liga Ouro champions, promoted)

Teams that left the league
Universo/Goiânia (16th place in the 2013–14 regular season, relegated)
Espírito Santo Basquetebol (17th place in the 2013–14 regular season, relegated)

Head coach changes
Pre-season changes

Mid-season changes

Regular season

League table

Results

Notes:
† Flamengo was punished by the LNB due to problems in the Ginásio Álvaro Vieira Lima and Pinheiros was declared the winner by 20–0 (walkover).

NBB All-Star Weekend 

For the third time in history the All-Star Weekend was played at Ginásio Pedrocão in Franca, São Paulo on March 6–7, 2015. In the first day of the event, it was disputed the "Dunk Tournament", "Three-Point Tournament", "Skills Challenge" and "Shooting Stars Competition". The NBB All-Star Game was played on the following day with NBB Brasil defeated NBB Mundo for the fourth straight year (131–110).

Playoffs

First round

(5) Minas vs. (12) Macaé Basquete 
Game 1

Game 2

Game 3

Game 4

(6) Paulistano vs. (11) São José 
Game 1

Game 2

Game 3

Game 4

(7) Pinheiros vs. (10) Brasília 
Game 1

Game 2

Game 3

Game 4

(8) Franca vs. (9) Palmeiras 
Game 1

Game 2

Game 3

Game 4

Game 5

Quarterfinals

(1) Bauru vs. (8) Franca 
Game 1

Game 2

Game 3

Game 4

Game 5

(4) Mogi das Cruzes vs. (12) Macaé Basquete 
Game 1

Game 2

Game 3

Game 4

Game 5

(2) Limeira vs. (10) Brasília 
Game 1

Game 2

Game 3

Game 4

(3) Flamengo vs. (11) São José 
Game 1

Game 2

Game 3

Game 4

Game 5

Semifinals

(1) Bauru vs. (4) Mogi das Cruzes 
Game 1

Game 2

Game 3

Game 4

Game 5

(2) Limeira vs. (3) Flamengo 
Game 1

Game 2

Game 3

Finals: (1) Bauru vs. (3) Flamengo 
Game 1

Game 2

Statistical leaders

Individual tournament highs

Points

Rebounds

Assists

Blocks

Steals

Efficiency

References

External links

 

2014-15
NBB
Brazil